Highclere (pronounced ) is a village and civil parish situated in the North Wessex Downs (an Area of Outstanding Natural Beauty) in the Basingstoke and Deane district of Hampshire, England. It lies in the northern part of the county, near the Berkshire border. It is most famous for being the location of Highclere Castle, a noted Victorian house of the Earl of Carnarvon. It is the setting for numerous films and TV series, including Downton Abbey.

History and buildings
The parish church of St Michael and All Angels sits between Highclere Castle and the main part of the village. This 'new' church (1870s) replaced a much older church sited adjacent to Highclere Castle, and parish records go back to pre-Norman times.

There is a pub, the Red House, a flourishing village hall and a private junior ('Prep') school, Thorngrove. The church parish is part of the North West Hampshire Benefice (with Ashmansworth, Crux Easton, East Woodhay and Woolton Hill). The civil parish of Highclere has two wards, Highclere and Penwood.

"Highclere Holly" (Ilex altaclerensis) was first identified here and still flourishes in local woodlands.

According to local legend there used to be a grampus living in a yew tree in the churchyard of the Highclere Estate Chapel.

On 22 August 1213, King John stayed at Peter des Roches the Bishop of Winchester's manor at Highclere, then called Bishop's Clere. An itinerary of King Edward II lists him as spending 2 September 1320 there.

Economy
Highclere is home to a number of prominent local businesses that use locally and sustainably sourced products, such as Berkshire Fencing Supplies (formerly the Natural Garden site overlooking Highclere Castle) supplying a great range of natural home grown hazel hurdles and willow fencing which is very environmentally friendly compared to cutting more trees down. The local pub, the Red House serves a great range of organic local meats and poultry and a cafe, the Galloping Bistro serving fair trade coffee and an array of other local goodies.

See also 

 Highclere Castle

References

External links

Villages in Hampshire
Civil parishes in Basingstoke and Deane